Repetitive songs contain a large proportion of repeated words or phrases. Simple repetitive songs are common in many cultures as widely spread as the Caribbean, Southern India and Finland. The best-known examples are probably children's songs. Other repetitive songs are found, for instance, in African-American culture from the days of slavery.

Structure

Self referential songs quote their own lyrics; one example is "The Song That Never Ends". Cumulative songs build from one verse to another, like bricks on a pile, as in "Old McDonald Had a Farm". 'Counting songs' may count up or down, as with "99 Bottles of Beer". 

Another type of song describes a circular phenomenon (see Recursion). In "There's a Hole in My Bucket", the singer-narrator attempts to fix a leaky bucket, only to find out that ultimately one needs to have a functional bucket in order to effect the repair. In "Where Have All the Flowers Gone?", flowers were offered to soldiers, who fell in a war, new flowers grew on their graves, those flowers were given to soldiers and so on.

Children's songs
In children's songs, repetition serves various educational purposes: repetition aids memory, can aid in learning punctuation and reading skills, and is very valuable in learning (foreign) languages.

Work songs
Repetitive songs are also found in traditional work songs. Examples abound in African-American culture, in political groups, and among traveler, marchers, and walkers. see Slave Songs of the United States.

Examples in English
"Michael Finnegan"
"The Song That Never Ends"
"There's a Hole in My Bucket"
"John Jacob Jingleheimer Schmidt"
"Found a Peanut"
"Versace (song)"
"Yon Yonson"
"10 Green Bottles"
"99 Bottles of Beer"
"Jesus' Blood Never Failed Me Yet"
"Ti amo"
"Ievan Polkka" (5th stanza) by Loituma, seen frequently in the infamous "Leekspin" animation
"The Wheels on the Bus"
"If You're Happy and You Know It"
"Head, Shoulders, Knees and Toes"
"Badger Song"
"Around the World"
"The Rockafeller Skank"
"I'm Henery the Eighth, I Am"
"Do What U Want"
"I Want You (She's So Heavy)"
"Jack Your Body"
"Why Don't We Do It in the Road?"
"You Know My Name (Look Up the Number)"
"The Twelve Days of Christmas"
"Gucci Gang"
"Green Grow the Rushes, O"
"There Was an Old Lady Who Swallowed a Fly"
"Five Little Monkeys"
"Who Stole the Cookie from the Cookie Jar"
"Little Bunny Foo Foo"
"The Farmer in the Dell"
"Ten German Bombers"

See also
Donald Knuth, "The Complexity of Songs"
Cumulative song
Repetitive music

References

Children's songs
Folk songs
Lullabies
Work music
Song forms
Repetition (music)